Vittorio Cioni (12 October 1900 in Pisa – 29 September 1981) was an Italian rower who competed in the 1932 Summer Olympics.

In 1932 he won the silver medal as member of the Italian boat in the men's eight competition.

References

External links
 profile

1900 births
1981 deaths
Sportspeople from Pisa
Italian male rowers
Olympic rowers of Italy
Rowers at the 1932 Summer Olympics
Olympic silver medalists for Italy
Olympic medalists in rowing
Medalists at the 1932 Summer Olympics
European Rowing Championships medalists